Brestovica pri Povirju is a small settlement north of Povir in the Municipality of Sežana in the Littoral region of Slovenia.

Name
The name of the settlement was changed from Brestovica to Brestovica pri Povirju in 1953.

Notable people
Notable people that were born or lived in Brestovica pri Povirju include:
France Rebec (1841 – after 1871), journalist and translator

References

External links
Brestovica pri Povirju on Geopedia

Populated places in the Municipality of Sežana